Dragon City is a free-to-play social network game developed and published by Socialpoint.

Gameplay 
Dragon City tasks players to raise their dragons and design a city full of dragons on floating islands. Gold produced by dragons can be used to buy and upgrade buildings and habitats. Farms can be used to grow food, which can be used to level up dragons, improving their strength depending on the dragon's rarity, and increase gold production. You can also breed two dragons that are at least Level 4 to produce a new and hybrid dragon. In addition to raising the dragons, players can use them to battle other players' dragons through League Battles. These battles can award you multiple important resources like Gems and Food which can make your progression in the game faster.

Aside from raising dragons and taking them to battle, players can participate in limited-time events that allow them to obtain new and exclusive dragons. There is a multitude of events that have different requirements to get them. 

Once a player has reached Level 27, the Ancient World can be accessed, which is an area of the game where Gold can be exchanged for Crystals (ruby, sapphire, topaz, emerald, onyx, and diamond) which can be collected from mines that can be used to summon and evolve Ancient Dragons. The crafting station is used to craft better tiers of crystals using lower-tier crystals and platinum. Platinum is generated by the ancient dragons similar to how the regular dragons generate gold.

In the game, there are up to 14 element types, and dragons come with up to 4 elements that they can learn moves from. The elements are Terra, Flame, Sea, Nature, Electric, Ice, Metal, Dark, Light, War, Pure, Legend, Primal, and Wind. As of the Ancient World Update, 6 additional elements have been added, which are: Beauty, Magic, Chaos, Happy, Dream, and Soul. As of the 10th Birthday Update, a new dragon element was added, which is Time.

Previously, there were 5 rarities of dragons, which are Common, Rare, Very Rare, Epic, and Legendary. On 15 April 2016, a new rarity of dragons was released. The new rarity was Heroic and was introduced alongside the first Heroic dragon, the High Fenrir Dragon.

Release
Dragon City was first released in Facebook in May 2012, with iOS and Android in 2013. On February 26, 2019, the Microsoft Windows version of the game was released. On February 2, 2020, the Facebook version of the game was closed.

References

External links
 

2012 video games
Android (operating system) games
Browser-based multiplayer online games
Facebook games
Free-to-play video games
IOS games
Social casual games
Take-Two Interactive franchises
Video games about dragons
Video games developed in Spain
Windows games